Silver Creek High School is a public high school located in Longmont, Colorado. It is part of the St. Vrain Valley School District. Silver Creek hosts Universal High School, an independent learning program, and the Silver Creek Leadership Academy.

School colors and mascot
Silver Creek's colors are maroon and silver. The mascot, a raptor, is often depicted as the tiger owl.

Universal High School

Universal High School (UHS) at Silver Creek is an alternative education system for students whose independent learning is more effective.  The program is standards-based and students are able to complete courses in a timeframe that suits their needs, anywhere from a week to a year. Students enrolled in UHS have the option of taking regular classes at Silver Creek High School or at their original high school, independent studies, and online courses. Students are required to take at least four regular courses in order to be considered full-time, or two in order to be part-time.

Demographics
The demographic breakdown of the 1,129 students enrolled in 2018–2019 was:
American Indian/Alaskan Native: 0.07%
Asian: 5.37%
Black: 1.41%
Hispanic: 14.50%
Native Hawaiian/Pacific Islander: N/A
White: 75.88%
Two or more races: 2.76%

Students eligible for free or reduced lunch: 1.31%

Athletic accomplishments

See also
St. Vrain Valley School District
Longmont, Colorado
Index of Colorado-related articles

References

External links
 

Public high schools in Colorado
Longmont, Colorado
Schools in Boulder County, Colorado
Educational institutions established in 2001
2001 establishments in Colorado